Acilius Severus was a member of the Roman aristocracy of the fourth century AD. He is known to have been consul with Vettius Rufinus as his colleague, and to have served as urban prefect of Rome (January 325 – November 326).

By his name, Severus appears to be related to the gens Acilia, an ancient Roman family whose descendants can be traced into the third century. However, it is not known how or even if whether Severus is related to Marcus Acilius Glabrio (consul 256) or Manius Acilius Aviola (consul 239).

References 
  Roger S. Bagnall, Alan Cameron, Seth R. Schwartz, Klaas A. Worp, Consuls of the Later Roman Empire (1987), p. 180

4th-century Romans
Severus
Imperial Roman consuls
Urban prefects of Rome